The Performing Arts Training Center (PATC) was opened in 1967 in East St. Louis, Illinois by world-renowned African American dancer Katherine Dunham who was then Artist-in-Residence at Southern Illinois University Edwardsville. Dunham partnered with SIUE's Experiment in Higher Education to add educational resources to the program and give the youth of East St. Louis a better educational experience.

The PATC (later known as the Katherine Dunham Center for the Performing Arts) offered credit and non-credit courses in such arts as dance, martial arts, and crafts. At times, its company of dancers has toured widely. Now known as the Performing Arts Program, it is a part of  SIUE's East St. Louis Center,

References

External links
SIUE East St. Louis Center
SIUE

Performing arts education in the United States
Southern Illinois University Edwardsville
Performing arts in Illinois